Penetrations from the Lost World is the first EP by the Swedish melodic death metal band Dimension Zero.

It was re-issued in 2003 with bonus tracks.

Track listing

Note
Tracks 5-6 recorded in November 2001.
Tracks 7-11 recorded live in Osaka, Nagoya and Tokyo, Japan, in May 2002.

Line-up 
 Jocke Göthberg - vocals, lyrics
 Glenn Ljungström - guitar, music composition, rhythm guitar (tracks 7-11)
 Jesper Strömblad - bass guitar, music composition
 Hans Nilsson - drums
 Daniel Antonsson - lead guitar (tracks 7-11)

Dimension Zero (Swedish band) albums
Albums recorded at Studio Fredman
Albums produced by Fredrik Nordström